N. R. Elango is an Indian politician and a member of Dravida Munnetra Kazhagam (DMK). He is a member of the Rajya Sabha, the upper house of the Parliament of India, from Tamil Nadu in 2020.

References

1966 births
Living people
Rajya Sabha members from Tamil Nadu
Dravida Munnetra Kazhagam politicians